UAAP Season 82 was the 2019–20 athletic year of the University Athletic Association of the Philippines (UAAP). The season was hosted by the Ateneo de Manila University.

The eight member universities of the UAAP competed in the league's sixteen sport disciplines to vie for the general championship as 3x3 Basketball will now be included as a medal event in the Seniors level, with points counted towards the general championships.

The season was cancelled mid-way on April 7, 2020, due to the coronavirus pandemic which spread to the Philippines by January 2020 after the enhanced community quarantine was extended to April 30, 2020.

Press conference
A press conference was held at MOA Arena in the morning of September 1, 2019. The following were announced by the UAAP Board: In support of the 2019 Southeast Asian Games that the Philippines will host from November 30, 2019 to December 11, 2019, no UAAP event will be held for the duration of the regional meet; necessitating triple-headers during Wednesdays for men's and women's basketball in order for the tournament to end by the third week of November. Another way of ensuring the league's full cooperation, the UAAP Board will move some of the traditional first semester sports events into the second semester.

Host Ateneo de Manila University announced the addition of new sporting events in both the collegiate and high school divisions. Starting season 82, 3x3 Basketball will be an official sport. For the high school division, boys' and girls' beach volleyball will be added as medal events and boys' and girls' lawn tennis as demo sports. For the first time in league history, a girls' basketball tournament will be held as a demonstration sport starting UAAP Season 82. National University will serve as the sub-host for this inaugural tournament.

UAAP President Em Fernandez explained that for the past two seasons, 3x3 basketball has been a demonstration sport and with the active participation of all member schools, the league has deemed to upgrade it as an official sport, raising the medal events in the collegiate level to 31.

Far Eastern University will serve as the sub-host for this season's 3x3 basketball tournament that is set to take place in March 2020.

On the other hand, lawn tennis and beach volleyball in the high school division will be making its debut.

Beach volleyball, which will be sub-hosted by University of Santo Tomas, will open its curtains in January 2020 while lawn tennis, which will be sub-hosted by National University, is scheduled to take place in February 2020.

Another firsts for the country's most prestigious collegiate league are the official Twitter and Instagram accounts (both @uaap_official) where official announcements from the league will be posted by the current school host and will be handed over to the next host once the current season is over.

Opening ceremony
The opening ceremony of UAAP Season 82 was held on September 1, 2019 at the Mall of Asia Arena. "All for More" is the theme for Season 82. Like Season 74 (the last time Ateneo hosted) and Season 79, the start of the men's basketball games won't be held after the opening ceremony. Instead, it will be held three days later on September 4, 2019 at the Smart Araneta Coliseum. The high school volleyball tournament also commences on the same day.

Sports calendar
This is the calendar of sports events of UAAP Season 82. The list includes the tournament host schools and the venues. Note should be taken for a compressed calendar as the Philippines will also be hosting the 2019 Southeast Asian Games in the middle of the season, from November to December.

First semester

Second semester

Basketball

The UAAP Season 82 collegiate basketball tournament began on September 4, 2019 at the Smart Araneta Coliseum. The tournament host is the Ateneo de Manila University. Jensen Ilagan and Edith Boticario are the tournament and deputy tournament commissioners, respectively. The tournament director is former Ateneo Blue Eagle and ex-Lyceum Jrs. head coach Lawrence Anthony "L.A." Mumar. The UAAP will adopt FIBA rules on technicals, timeouts, among others. The primary playing venues are the Mall of Asia Arena and the Smart Araneta Coliseum. The Ynares Center Antipolo and the UST's Quadricentennial Pavilion will serve as alternate venues when the MOA Arena and Araneta Coliseum are not available. the University Athletic Association of the Philippines (UAAP) will tap the services of its own exclusive group of referees.

Men's tournament

Elimination round

Playoffs

Awards

Women's tournament

Elimination round

Playoffs

Awards

Boys' tournament

Elimination round

Playoffs

Awards

Girls' tournament

Elimination round

Playoffs

 Note

Awards

Volleyball

The UAAP Season 82 volleyball tournaments started on September 4, 2019 with the high school tournaments and will start on March 3, 2020 for the collegiate tournaments. The games were played at the Filoil Flying V Centre, SM Mall of Asia Arena, Smart Araneta Coliseum, PhilSports Arena (ULTRA), Paco Arene and the Blue Eagle Gym. The volleyball tournament commissioner is Noreen Go.

The UAAP is implementing the use of the video challenge for Season 82 collegiate division volleyball tournaments as an effort to enhance the level of play and follow the international standards of the sport. UAAP president Em Fernandez of season host Ateneo de Manila University announced on February 11, 2020 in its very first-ever press conference for volleyball the new innovation that is expected to make the competition even more exciting.

The new system allowed coaches to challenge a call or non-call thru a video review. The system was utilized starting right from the opening games of the men's and women's divisions.

However both the senior men's and women's tournament was cancelled due to the COVID-19 pandemic.

Men's tournament

Elimination round

Team standings

Women's tournament

Elimination round

Team standings

Boys' tournament

Elimination round

Team standings

Playoffs

Awards
Finals' Most Valuable Player: 
 Most Valuable Player: 
 Rookie of the Year:

Girls' tournament

Elimination round

Team standings

Playoffs

Awards
Finals' Most Valuable Player: 
Season Most Valuable Player: 
Rookie of the Year:

Beach volleyball
The UAAP beach volleyball tournament was expanded in Season 82. The tournament which has one division only - the Collegiate division - will have two divisions starting UAAP season 82 (2019-2020).  A high school division for both boys and girls was added. All eight universities will field teams in the boys' tournament but only seven in the girls' tournament. University of the Philippines will not participate in the girls' tournament.

The collegiate tournament started on Sept. 22, 2019 and was concluded on October 6, 2019. While the high school tournament will start on February 1, 2020. The tournaments' venue is at the Sands SM by the Bay, SM Mall of Asia in Pasay, Metro Manila. University of Santo Tomas is the tournament host. Beach volleyball is a single round-robin elimination tournament.

Men's tournament

Elimination round

Team standings

Match-up results

Playoffs

Awards
 Most Valuable Player: 
 Rookie of the Year:

Women's tournament

Elimination round

Team standings

Match-up results

Playoffs

Awards
 Most Valuable Player: 
 Rookie of the Year:

Boys' tournament
The boy's tournament was cancelled prior to the play-offs.

Elimination round

Team standings

Match-up results

Girls' tournament
The girls' tournament was cancelled prior to the playoffs.

Elimination round

Team standings

Match-up results

Football
The UAAP Season 82 football tournaments started on January 5, 2020 for the high school tournament and on March 5, 2020 for the collegiate tournament. The venue for the high school tournament will be at the Rizal Memorial Football Stadium and the FEU-Diliman Football Field, while the men's tournament will be played at the Moro Lorenzo Football Field and the FEU-Diliman Football Field. The women's tournament will be played at the CV Pitch Circulo Verde Quezon City. The tournament host is __.

Men's tournament

Elimination round

Team standings

Match-up results

Results
Results on top and to the right of the dashes are for first-round games; those to the bottom and to the left of it are second-round games.

Women's tournament

Elimination round

Team standings

Match-up results

Results
Results on top and to the right of the dashes are for first-round games; those to the bottom and to the left of it are second-round games.

Boys' tournament
The UAAP Season 82 high school football tournament started on January 5, 2020. The playing venue is at the Rizal Memorial Football Stadium. La Salle is the tournament host.

Elimination round

Team standings

Match-up results

Results
Results on top and to the right of the dashes are for first-round games; those to the bottom and to the left of it are second-round games.

Finals

|-

Awards
 Most Valuable Player: 
 Rookie of the Year: 
 Best Striker: 
 Best Midfielder: 
 Best Defender: 
 Best Goalkeeper: 
 Fair Play Award:

Baseball

Boys' tournament
The UAAP Season 82 boys' division baseball tournament began on October 8, 2019, at the Rizal Memorial Baseball Stadium in Malate, Manila. The tournament host is Adamson University.

Elimination round

Team standings

Match-up results

Scores
Results on top and to the right of the dashes are for first-round games; those to the bottom and to the left of it are second-round games.

Playoffs

Awards
 Season Most Valuable Player: 
 Finals Most Valuable Player: 
 Rookie of the Year: 
 Best Pitcher: 
 Best Hitter: 
 Best Slugger: 
 Most Runs Batted-In: 
 Most Home-runs: 
 Most Stolen Bases:

Table tennis
The UAAP Season 82 table tennis tournament began on November 9, 2019. The tournament venue was the Ateneo Blue Eagle Gym. Ateneo de Manila was the tournament host.

Men's tournament

Elimination round

Team standings

Playoffs

Awards
 Most Valuable Player: 
 Rookie of the Year:

Women's tournament

Elimination round

Team standings

Playoffs

Awards
 Most Valuable Player: 
 Rookie of the Year:

Judo
The UAAP Season 82 judo championships was held from February 29, 2020 to March 1, 2020 at the SM Mall of Asia Arena. The tournament host is De La Salle University.

Men's tournament

Team standings

Event host in boldface

Awards
 Most Valuable Player: 
 Rookie of the Year:

Women's tournament

Team standings

Event host in boldface

Awards
 Most Valuable Player: 
 Rookie of the Year:

Boys' tournament

Team standings

Event host in boldface

Awards
 Most Valuable Player: 
 Rookie of the Year:

Girls' tournament

Team standings

Event host in boldface

Awards
 Most Valuable Player:  
 Rookie of the Year:

Swimming
The UAAP Season 82 Swimming Championships was held from October 17–20, 2019 at the Trace Aquatic Center, Trace College, Laguna The tournament host is __ and tournament commissioner is __ . The number of participating teams in the Girls' tournament increased by one school with the participation of Ateneo. There are now six schools participating.

Team ranking is determined by a point system, similar to that of the overall championship. The points given are based on the swimmer's/team's finish in the finals of an event, which include only the top eight finishers from the preliminaries. The gold medalist(s) receive 15 points, silver gets 12, bronze has 10. The following points: 8, 6, 4, 2 and 1 are given to the rest of the participating swimmers/teams according to their order of finish.

Men's tournament

Team standings
 
Rec - Number of new swimming records established
Event host in boldface

Awards
 Most Valuable Player: 
 Rookie of the Year:

Women's tournament

Team standings

Rec - Number of new swimming records established
Event host in boldface

Awards
 Most Valuable Player: 
 Rookie of the Year:

Boys' tournament

Team standings

Rec - Number of new swimming records established
Event host in boldface

Awards
 Most Valuable Player: 
  Rookie of the Year:

Girls' tournament

Team standings

Rec - Number of new swimming records established
Event host in boldface

Awards
 Most Valuable Player: 
  Rookie of the Year:

Performance sports

Cheerdance
The UAAP Season 82 cheerdance competition was held on November 17, 2019 at the Mall of Asia Arena in Pasay.  Cheerdance competition is an exhibition event. Points for the overall championship are not awarded to the participating schools.

Team standings

General championship summary 
The general champion is determined by a point system. The system gives 15 points to the champion team of a UAAP event, 12 to the runner-up, and 10 to the third placer. The following points: 8, 6, 4, 2 and 1 are given to the rest of the participating teams according to their order of finish.

Medals table

Collegiate division

High school division

General championship tally

Collegiate division

High school division

Broadcast notes
The Season 82 is the last UAAP games and final broadcast by ABS-CBN Sports, a sports division of ABS-CBN Corporation aired on S+A and Liga the UAAP Games and ABS-CBN was TV partner of a 20 years.
However, their contract with the network's sports division expired and leaved in jeopardy, due to the issue of legislative franchise renewal and the denial of the franchise, which leads to the sports division's dissolution following their retrenchment on August 31, 2020. As of October 21, 2020, the league chose Cignal TV/One Sports as a new partner to air the UAAP games next season.

The final broadcasters are:

Sports commentator
Boom Gonzalez
Anton Roxas
Eric Tipan
Nikko Ramos
Jing Jamlang (Football only)
Mico Halili (Basketball only)
Martin Javier (Basketball and Volleyball only)
Synjin Reyes (Volleyball only)
Billie Capistrano (Volleyball only)
Carmela Tunay (Volleyball only)
Noreen Go (Volleyball only)
Denice Dinsay (Volleyball only)

Color commentator
Kirk Long
Enzo Flojo
Marco Benitez
Ronnie Magsanoc
Christian Luanzon
Bea Daez (Basketball only)
AJ Pareja (Volleyball only)
Mozzy Ravena (Volleyball only)
Bea de Leon (Volleyball only)
Nicole Tiamzon (Volleyball only)
Martin Antonio (Volleyball only)
Alyssa Valdez (Volleyball only)
Michele Gumabao (Volleyball only)
Anne Remulla-Canda (Volleyball only)
John Vic De Guzman (Volleyball only)
Marielle Benitez-Javellana (Football only)

See also
 NCAA Season 95

References

 
81
UAAP
UAAP
Sports events curtailed due to the COVID-19 pandemic